Kylie Showgirl is a live DVD by Australian pop singer Kylie Minogue. Filmed during Minogue's Showgirl: The Greatest Hits Tour on 6 May 2005 at Earls Court Exhibition Centre in London, England, it was released by EMI on 25 November 2005 in Europe.

Track listing

Notes
 Yip Harburg is miscredited as Hamburg.

Charts
In 2005, Kylie Showgirl was certified 3× Platinum in Australia by the Australian Recording Industry Association, and became the twenty-sixth best selling music DVD in the country. The following year the DVD was re-certified 4× Platinum.

Certifications

|-

|-

|-

Release details

Notes

Kylie Minogue video albums
Live video albums
2005 video albums
Kylie Minogue live albums
2005 live albums